Saints Eusebius, Nestablus, Zeno, and Nestor (died ) were early Christian martyrs in Gaza, Palestine.

Life

Saints Eusebius, Nestablus and Zeno were three Christian brothers in Gaza during the reign of Julian (r. 361–363).
They were imprisoned and tortured, then dragged out by a mob, beaten and killed.
Their bodies were burned and their bones were mixed with those of camels and asses.
A young man named Nestor was seized with them, tortured and beaten, but then released. 
He died three days later.
According to Sozomen (lib. 5, c.8) the bones of Nestablus and Eusebius were revealed by a miracle to a holy woman who collected and preserved them.
The Roman Martyrology gives their feast day as 8 September.

Butler's account

The hagiographer Alban Butler ( 1710–1773) wrote in his Lives of the Primitive Fathers, Martyrs, and Other Principal Saints, under September 8,

Notes

Sources

 

Groups of Christian martyrs of the Roman era
4th-century Christian martyrs
362 deaths